The Madrid–Valencia de Alcántara line is an Iberian-gauge railway in Spain owned by ADIF. It is the one of the main legacy lines across Extremadura and the province of Toledo, serving cities such as Talavera de la Reina and Cáceres. Part of the stretch across the Madrid region (up until Humanes) is used by commuter service C-5..

History and description 
The line was conceived as an union of three different stretches commissioned to different companies: Madrid–Malpartida de Plasencia, Malpartida de Plasencia-Cáceres and Cáceres-Valencia de Alcántara and beyond (to the Portuguese border),

The international connection between Spain and Portugal via Valencia de Alcántara was inaugurated on 8 October 1881. The Lisbon-Madrid-Paris Sud Express began operation in 1887.

Since August 2012, the connection with Portugal via Valencia de Alcántara has been severed, and the  connecting Lisbon and Madrid began operating via the province of Salamanca instead.

The railway is electrified from Madrid to Humanes. The aforementioned double-track electrified stretch is integrated in Cercanías Madrid's service C-5. Starting from the boundary of the municipality of Humanes, the railroad line continues without electrification on a single track. The electrification from Plasencia to Humanes is also projected.

Stations 

 Torrijos
 Talavera de la Reina
 Cáceres

See also 
 Ramal de Cáceres

References 

Railway lines in Spain
Transport in Extremadura
Rail transport in the Community of Madrid
Transport in Castilla–La Mancha